Argeneh-ye Sofla (also Romanized as Argeneh-ye Soflá; also known as Argana, Argeneh, Argeneh-ye Pā’īn, Qal‘a Argana, Qal‘eh-ye Argenā, and Qal‘eh-ye Argeneh) is a village in Gamasiyab Rural District, in the Central District of Sahneh County, Kermanshah Province, Iran. At the 2006 census, its population was 573, in 137 families.

References 

Populated places in Sahneh County